Ceri Evans (born 2 October 1963 in Christchurch, New Zealand) is a New Zealand former association football player who frequently represented his country as a central defender in the 1980s and 1990s.

After graduating in medicine with distinction from the University of Otago, Evans attended Oxford University as a Rhodes scholar, gaining a first class honours in Experimental Psychology while playing football for Oxford United. He is the son of Gwyn Evans who played professionally for Crystal Palace, for Christchurch United and Nelson United in New Zealand and who also became a senior official in the New Zealand Football Association.

Ceri's interest in traumatic memory saw him interview over 100 violent offenders to gain his PhD. He was awarded the Gaskell Gold Medal by the Royal College of Psychiatrists and specialised in forensic psychiatry.

After returning home to Christchurch, Ceri served as Clinical Director of the Canterbury Regional Forensic Psychiatry Service, led national projects on violence risk assessment and prison mental health screening and served as an expert witness in leading civil and criminal cases.

Ceri has been invited into leading organisations across the spectrum to support their drive for excellence in demanding, high stakes environments.

His Red-Blue mind model is used by people serious about performing under pressure, from doctors to lawyers, from executive teams to special teams, and from professionals to amateurs. He is perhaps best known for his work with the New Zealand All Blacks for whom he has provided specialist consultancy since 2010.

In 2018 Ceri was made a Fellow of the Royal College of Psychiatrists and awarded his football coaching A licence.

His book 'Perform Under Pressure' is due for publication in July 2019 in New Zealand and Australia and September in the UK.

International career
Evans made his full All Whites debut in a 5–1 win over Kuwait on 16 October 1980 and ended his international playing career with 56 A-international caps and 2 goals to his credit, his final cap coming in a 0–3 loss to Australia on 6 June 1993.

Professional career
MBChB MA MSc Dip ForMH MRCPsych PhD.: University of Otago MBChB;
University of Oxford MA (Experimental Psychology);
Fellow of Royal College of Psychiatrists (and Gaskell Gold Medal winner);
Career in forensic psychiatry;
Founder of 'Gazing', a motivational psychology consultancy

References

External links 

1963 births
Alumni of the University of London
Living people
New Zealand international footballers
New Zealand Rhodes Scholars
New Zealand association footballers
New Zealand people of Welsh descent
Wellington United players
Oxford United F.C. players
Association footballers from Christchurch
University of Otago alumni
Alumni of Worcester College, Oxford
People educated at Nayland College
Marlow F.C. players
Association football defenders